Uch Tappeh (also Romanized as Ūch Tappeh) is a village in Akhtachi-ye Sharqi Rural District, Simmineh District, Bukan County, West Azerbaijan Province, Iran. At the 2006 census, its population was 1,716, in 328 families.

References 

Populated places in Bukan County